All the Money in the World is a 2017 biographical crime thriller film directed by Ridley Scott and written by David Scarpa. Based on John Pearson's 1995 book Painfully Rich: The Outrageous Fortunes and Misfortunes of the Heirs of J. Paul Getty, it depicts the events surrounding the 1973 kidnapping of John Paul Getty III and the refusal of his grandfather, the multi-billionaire oil tycoon J. Paul Getty, to cooperate with the kidnappers' extortion demands. The film stars Michelle Williams as John Paul Getty III's mother, Christopher Plummer as Getty, and Mark Wahlberg as an adviser of the Getty family.

The principal photography began in March 2017 and was completed in August 2017 for a December 8, 2017, release. Kevin Spacey was originally cast to play Getty, however, two months before the scheduled premiere, sexual misconduct allegations were made against him. By November, Plummer replaced Spacey and 22 scenes were reshot within eight days, one month prior to the rearranged release date at Christmas. It was later reported that Wahlberg had been paid $1.5 million to Williams's $1,000 for the reshoots, which sparked a debate on gender pay gap in Hollywood.

All the Money in the World premiered at the Samuel Goldwyn Theater in Beverly Hills on December 18, 2017, followed by a United States theatrical release by TriStar Pictures on December 25, 2017. It received positive reviews, with praise for the performances, and grossed $57 million against a $50 million budget. Plummer received particular acclaim as Getty, earning him an Academy Award nomination for Best Supporting Actor.

Plot
In 1973, 16-year-old John Paul Getty III, grandson of oil tycoon J. Paul Getty, who is at that time the world's richest private citizen, is kidnapped in Rome by the 'Ndrangheta, a Mafia-like organized crime group and secret society based in Calabria; a ransom of $17 million is demanded. His mother, Gail Harris, is unable to pay the ransom, as she rejected any alimony in exchange for full custody of her children when she divorced her husband, John Paul Getty Jr., in 1971 over his drug addiction. She travels to Getty's estate to beseech him to pay the ransom but, stating that it would encourage further kidnappings of his family members, he instead asks Fletcher Chace, a Getty Oil negotiator and former CIA operative, to investigate the case and secure Paul's release. The media picks up on the story, with many believing Gail to be rich herself and blaming her for the refusal to pay the ransom.

Paul is kept hostage in a remote location in Italy. Initially, his captors, particularly Cinquanta, are tolerant with him because his quiet and submissive demeanor causes them few problems. However, things grow increasingly tense as weeks go by without the ransom being paid, far longer than the captors anticipated. Arguments arise over whether to move Paul to a new location as winter is approaching and their hideout is not suitable for cold conditions. One of the kidnappers accidentally shows his face to Paul, and he considers killing Paul so he cannot be identified, but one of the other kidnappers kills him first. His burned and disfigured body is recovered in the river; investigators erroneously identify the body as Paul's, but Gail examines the body and refutes this.

Using the new lead of the body, Chace is able to pinpoint the hideout where Paul is being held. A raid is conducted with several kidnappers being killed, but Paul is no longer there; he has been sold to a new 'ndrina, or crime family. The new captors are much less patient with Paul and negotiate more aggressively with the Getty family to receive their payment. The kidnappers cut off one of Paul's ears and mail it to a major newspaper, claiming that they will continue mutilating him until the ransom is paid.

After repeated negotiations with Gail and Chace, and frustration from the captors at how long the process was taking, they lower the asking price to $4 million. Getty finally decides to contribute to the ransom, but only $1 million – this being the maximum amount that he can claim as tax-deductible. Moreover, he also will only do so if Gail signs a legal document waiving her parental access rights to Paul and her other children, giving them to Getty's son, her ex-husband. She reluctantly signs them. Intimidated by an exasperated Chace, Getty finally relents and agrees to pay the full ransom, also voiding the parental agreement with Gail. Gail and Chace take the money to Italy and follow specific instructions from the captors, leaving the money in a remote location and receiving orders to pick up Paul from a construction site. Based on Cinquanta's advice, Paul runs away from the site towards the town of Lauria, miles away. Meanwhile, the captors realize that Chace has broken his word and led the police to them; angry, they decide to find and kill Paul. Chace, Gail, and the captors arrive in Lauria to look for Paul. One of the kidnappers finds Paul first, but Cinquanta attacks the man in order to allow Paul to escape. With Paul wrapped tightly in Gail's arms, they escape the scene, and quickly smuggle Paul out of the country to safety.

When Getty dies in 1976, Gail is tasked with managing her children's inherited wealth until they are of age. The company was set up as a charitable trust, which meant that Getty's income was tax-free but also not spendable. He had invested much of it in paintings, sculptures and other artifacts, most of which now reside in the J. Paul Getty Museum in Los Angeles.

Cast

Production

Development and pre-production
On March 13, 2017, it was reported that Ridley Scott was finalizing plans to direct the David Scarpa-scripted All the Money in the World, a film about the kidnapping of John Paul Getty III. Scott stated that he was attracted to the project because of Scarpa's script, adding "I just consumed it [...] I knew about the kidnapping, but this story was very, very provocative... Gail Getty was an exceptional character, and there are many facets of the man Getty that make him a really great study. There's this great dynamic. It was like a play, and not a movie."

Natalie Portman was pursued for the role of Gail Harris. On March 31, 2017, it was reported that Michelle Williams and Kevin Spacey were circling the roles of Harris and J. Paul Getty, respectively, while Mark Wahlberg was in talks for an unspecified role. On casting Spacey, Scott stated, "When I read the script, I started thinking, 'Who was Paul Getty?' In my mind, I saw Kevin Spacey. Kevin's a brilliant actor, but I've never worked with him, and I always knew I would have to have him portray Getty in this film [...] He was so obsessed with what he was doing [...] He wasn't giving people a second thought." In regard to Williams, Scott stated that, while she was not his first choice, "Michelle is very special as an actress, and I've never done anything with her before [...] The family was very private and there was very little footage of [Gail], but around the kidnapping, there was one particular interview she did that Michelle jumped at, and it shows Gail Getty being very assertive, very smart," both qualities Williams possessed. On May 2, Charlie Plummer joined the cast as John Paul Getty III. Timothy Hutton was added to the cast on June 16.

Initial filming
On May 31, 2017, it was reported that All the Money in the World had begun principal photography. Filming continued at Elveden Hall in west Suffolk for a week at the end of July. The aristocratic Grade II-listed stately home was used to represent a Moroccan palace in the filming of a series of flashback scenes. Spacey had worked for just 10 days on the film. The original production reportedly concluded in August.

Recasting of J. Paul Getty and reshoots

In late October, numerous sexual misconduct allegations were made against Kevin Spacey. The film's premiere at the AFI Fest on November 16 was canceled, and its Academy Awards campaign—which was initially to center on Spacey's supporting role—was reworked.

On November 9, it was announced that although the film was otherwise ready for release, reshoots had been commissioned with Christopher Plummer replacing Spacey in the role of Getty. Despite his earlier statements to the contrary, Scott claimed that Plummer had been his original choice play the role, and that studio executives had persuaded him to cast the "bigger name" Spacey. Spacey still appears in one wide shot that would have been too expensive or complex to reshoot before the deadline; the scene features Getty disembarking from a train in the desert, but Spacey's face is not visible.

Reshoots with Plummer ran from November 20 to 29, with the first footage of Plummer in the role released the same day they concluded. Reshoots cost $10 million, bringing the film's final production budget to $50 million.

While it was initially reported that the actors had filmed the reshoots for free, it was later revealed that Wahlberg had in fact been paid $1.5 million while Williams received only $80 in per diems. Wahlberg's fee for the original shooting is alleged by The Hollywood Reporter to have been $5 million, while Williams' is reported to have been paid $625,000. The New York Times reported that Wahlberg was paid 80 percent less than his usual fee, and the $1.5 million he received for reshoots was in addition to this; USA Today reported that he was able to command the additional fee by exercising a clause in his contract that gave him approval over his co-stars, refusing to agree to Plummer's casting until he was guaranteed the extra pay. As a result of backlash brought on by the disparity in the actors' pay, Wahlberg announced he would donate the $1.5 million to the Time's Up Legal Defense Fund in Williams' name.

Release
The film premiered at the Samuel Goldwyn Theater in Beverly Hills, California on December 18, 2017. In the United States, the film was originally slated for a release on December 22, 2017, but two weeks before its debut, it was pushed to December 25, to avoid competition with Star Wars: The Last Jedi. It was released on digital on March 27, 2018, and on DVD/Blu-ray on April 10, 2018.

Reception

Box office
All the Money in the World grossed $25.1 million in the United States and Canada and $31.8 million in other territories, for a worldwide total of $56.9 million, against a production budget of $50 million.

On Christmas Day, the film's opening day, it grossed $2.6 million from 2,068 theaters. In its first full weekend the film made $5.4 million from 2,074 theaters, finishing 7th at the box office. In its second weekend the film made $3.6 million, dropping 36% and finishing 10th.

Critical response
 On Metacritic, the film has a weighted average score of 72 out of 100, based on 47 critics, indicating "generally favorable reviews". Audiences polled by CinemaScore gave the film an average grade of "B" on an A+ to F scale.

Writing for The Hollywood Reporter, Todd McCarthy called it "a terrifically dexterous and detailed thriller about the Italian mob's 1973 kidnapping for ransom of the grandson of the world's richest man, John Paul Getty [sic]." Matt Zoller Seitz of RogerEbert.com gave the film three out of four stars, commending it as a whole despite criticizing the middle section as repetitive, and the character of J. Paul Getty being "repugnant" without proper context. He also argued that the director was impressive for his ability to create the film despite the Spacey controversy. Writing for Vulture, David Edelstein gave a strong review for the performance of Michelle Williams in the film, praising "the marvelous performance of Michelle Williams as Gail. It's a real transformation."

Accolades

See also
 Trust, a 2018 FX television series starring Donald Sutherland as J. Paul Getty, Hilary Swank as Gail Getty, and Brendan Fraser as James Fletcher Chace.

References

External links
 
 

2017 films
2017 biographical drama films
2017 crime drama films
2017 controversies
2017 controversies in the United States
2017 in American cinema
2010s controversies
2010s controversies in the United States
Advertising and marketing controversies in film
American biographical drama films
American crime drama films
Casting controversies in film
Crime films based on actual events
Drama films based on actual events
2010s English-language films
Film controversies
Film controversies in the United States
Films about dysfunctional families
Films about kidnapping
Films about the 'Ndrangheta
Films based on non-fiction books about organized crime
Films directed by Ridley Scott
Films scored by Daniel Pemberton
Films set in 1948
Films set in 1958
Films set in 1964
Films set in 1971
Films set in 1973
Films set in England
Films set in France
Films set in Italy
Films set in Rome
Films set in Morocco
Films set in San Francisco
Films set in Saudi Arabia
Films set in Surrey
Films shot in Italy
Films shot in Jordan
Films shot in Suffolk
Getty family
Salary controversies in film
Self-censorship
Sexual-related controversies in film
Scott Free Productions films
STX Entertainment films
TriStar Pictures films
2010s American films